William Harrison "Howdy" Martin (September 2, 1822 – February 5, 1898) was a Texas State Senator, U.S. Representative from Texas and veteran of the Confederate States Army who served under Robert E. Lee.

Biography

William Harrison Martin was born(see talk page) to Robert and Charlotte Martin,
in Twiggs County, Georgia on September 2, 1822. He married Martha Elizabeth Gallemore on February 12, 1867, in Navarro County, Texas. The couple had six children. Martha was born in Twiggs County, Georgia on June 22, 1846.

Martin attended the common schools in Alabama. He studied law at Troy State College, and was admitted to the bar.  In 1850, he moved to Texas and engaged in the practice of law in  Henderson County.

Military service

Harrison enlisted in the Confederate States Army in 1861, with the Company K, 4th Infantry, Hood's Texas Brigade  in the Texas Confederate Regiments during the Civil War.  His regiment fought in the Eastern Theater of the American Civil War. The brigade served throughout the war in Robert E. Lee's Army of Northern Virginia and in James Longstreet's First Corps. In April 1864, Martin was promoted to the rank of Major.

Nobody is sure how he got the nickname of "Howdy," but one war-time legend has it that he saw Robert E. Lee, stood up in his stirrups and yelled, "Howdy!"

Public service

He served as a member of the Texas State Senate 1853–1857 representing Freestone, Limestone, Henderson and Navarro counties.

After the war, Martin returned to Texas, continuing his law practice in Athens.

Martin was elected district attorney for Kaufman, Smith, Henderson and Anderson counties.

On February 12, 1887, he was elected as a Democrat to the 50th United States Congress to fill the vacancy of John H. Reagan who was chosen to serve in the United States Senate .  Martin was reelected to the 51st United States Congress and served from November 4, 1887, to March 3, 1891.  After which, he resumed his law practice. In 1888,  Martin took offense to articles George Herbert Harries had written about him in The Washington Star, and responded by attacking him in the United States Capitol. Harries preferred charges; Martin pleaded guilty to assault and was fined five dollars.

Death

William Harrison Martin died at his home near Hillsboro, Texas, February 5, 1898.  He is interred in Hillsboro Cemetery.

References

External sources

1822 births
1898 deaths
Democratic Party Texas state senators
People of Texas in the American Civil War
Texas lawyers
Confederate States Army officers
Democratic Party members of the United States House of Representatives from Texas
19th-century American politicians
People from Athens, Texas
People from Hillsboro, Texas
People from Twiggs County, Georgia
19th-century American lawyers
Military personnel from Texas